The 2000–01 season was the 115th season in the history of Luton Town Football Club, the club's 80th consecutive year in the Football League and its 83rd overall. Luton ended the season relegated from the Second Division, dropping into the basement level of League football for the first time since the 1967–68 season. The club went through a total of three managers following the departure of Lennie Lawrence; firstly Ricky Hill, then Lil Fuccillo, and eventually settling on Irishman Joe Kinnear. Under Kinnear's management, Luton underwent an initial resurgence, winning five of out of his first seven games. However, they failed to win any of their games in the final quarter of the season and ultimately slipped into the Third Division. Luton won only nine league games all season, setting a club record for the fewest wins over a 46-game season.

This article covers the period from 1 July 2000 to 30 June 2001.

Background
Luton suffered from severe financial difficulty throughout the 1998–99 season and were forced to sell a number of established players and promising young stars.One of the club's directors, Cliff Bassett, made the decision to place the club into receivership as part of a move to shift controversial owner David Kohler out of the club. Kohler, accused by Luton supporters of selling the club's assets while continuing to draw a large salary of his own and of promoting an unworkable stadium project (known as the 'Kohlerdome') for his own means, relinquished his position as chairman on 20 February 1999 following the discovery of a petrol bomb in his letterbox. Despite his departure, Kohler remained as the majority shareholder and held out from selling until a suitable offer was made. Numerous bids from consortia fell through, unable to meet Kohler's demands, until, after being told by the Football League that the club would be unable to compete in the 1999–2000 season unless it was out of receivership, Bassett himself stepped in hours before the deadline and bought out Kohler's shares. Luton finished the 1999–2000 season in 13th position, relying heavily on players brought through the youth system, such as Emmerson Boyce, Gary Doherty, Matthew Taylor, Matthew Spring and Liam George. Bassett made it clear throughout the season that his intention was to find a new owner for the club and, on 23 May 2000, Luton Town was sold to a consortium led by businessman Mike Watson-Challis.

Season summary
One of new chairman Mike Watson-Challis' first acts was, on 4 July, to sack manager Lennie Lawrence and look to appoint his own man. Ex-player and fan favourite Ricky Hill was appointed a week later, and was provided with the resources to build his own squad. One signing was that of goalkeeper Mark Ovendale from AFC Bournemouth, who cost £425,000; the most the club had spent on a player since the 1995–96 season when they were competing in the First Division. Ovendale struggled to make an impact, which was the story of most of Hill's acquisitions, who included among their number untested foreign players Friedrich Breitenfelder, Petri Helin and Kent Karlsen.

Hill's reign began with a defeat to Notts County and did not improve from there; one win in their first ten league games left Luton in the relegation zone and the fans voicing their displeasure. A penalty shootout victory over Peterborough United in the League Cup set up a tie with Premier League side Sunderland, but Luton collapsed to a 5–1 aggregate defeat. One further league win followed, but even more defeats left Luton in 23rd place by early November. Hill resigned on 15 November to be replaced by his assistant, another former Luton player, Lil Fuccillo. John Moore, who had led the club to their highest-ever league finish in the 1986–87 season and was in charge of the youth team, was installed as Fuccillo's assistant. Luton's fortunes failed to improve under this tenure, suffering seven further league defeats, though a run to the Third Round of the FA Cup did offer some respite.

With the club failing to impress on the pitch and facing the prospect of relegation, Watson-Challis acted to recruit a Director of Football to oversee "all football matters". Former Wimbledon manager Joe Kinnear was appointed to this role on 8 February, but his first act was to immediately demote Fuccillo to assistant and place himself in charge. Kinnear's arrival prompted an initial resurgence in form – Luton won five of their next seven games and were one point away from 20th position, and safety, by 6 March. However, they failed to win again during the campaign and, on 24 April, were relegated to the Third Division for the first time in 33 years following a 1–0 loss to Rotherham United.

With the season drawing to a close, Kinnear signed striker Steve Howard from nearby Northampton Town for a fee of £50,000, released five players, and transfer listed four others.

Match results
Luton Town results given first.

Legend

Friendlies

Football League Second Division
All results, goals, attendances etc. taken from Soccerbase

FA Cup

Football League Cup

Football League Trophy

League table

Player statistics
Last match played on 5 May 2001. Players with a zero in every column only appeared as unused substitutes.

Managerial statistics
Only competitive games from the 2000–01 season are included.

Transfers

In

Out

Loans in

See also
List of Luton Town F.C. seasons

Footnotes

A.  Luton progressed into the Second Round on the away goals rule.

References

Luton Town F.C. seasons
Luton Town